The Revised Statutes of Ontario (RSO;) is the name of several consolidations of public acts in the Canadian province of Ontario, promulgated approximately decennially from 1877 to 1990.

Each revision contains a consolidated version of all non-obsolete statutes of general application, incorporating amendments enacted before the consolidation date. Revisions are defined and published according to acts of the Legislative Assembly of Ontario. The last edition of the RSO was dated 1990 pursuant to the Statutes Revision Act, 1989, consolidating the statutes in force prior to January 1, 1991.

More recently, acts have been consolidated on the e-Laws website, organized by reference to their existing citations in the Statutes of Ontario or Revised Statutes of Ontario.

Revisions
1877
1887
1897
1914
1927
1937
1950
1960
1970
1980
1990

References

Ontario provincial legislation
1990 in Canadian law
1980 in Canadian law
1970 in Canadian law
1937 in Canadian law
1927 in Canadian law
1914 in Canadian law
1887 in Canadian law
1990 in Ontario
1980 in Ontario
1970 in Ontario
1960 in Ontario
1950 in Ontario
1937 in Ontario
1927 in Ontario
1914 in Ontario
1897 in Ontario
1887 in Ontario
1877 in Ontario